Ted Cabot (February 5, 1917 – December 4, 1971) was a United States district judge of the United States District Court for the Southern District of Florida.

Education and career

Born February 5, 1917, in Hobe Sound, Florida, Cabot served as Clerk of the Circuit Court for Broward County, Florida from 1945 to 1953. He received a Bachelor of Laws in 1953 from the University of Miami School of Law. He entered private practice in Fort Lauderdale, Florida from 1953 to 1959. He was a member of the Florida Senate from 1954 to 1958. He was a Judge of the Circuit Court in Broward County from 1959 to 1966.

Federal judicial service

Cabot was nominated by President Lyndon B. Johnson on July 11, 1966, to the United States District Court for the Southern District of Florida, to a new seat authorized by 80 Stat. 75. He was confirmed by the United States Senate on August 10, 1966, and received his commission on August 11, 1966. His service terminated on December 4, 1971, due to his death.

Notable case

"It is a third irony that Ted Cabot, who as a state senator helped sponsor legislation to authorize Broward County's purchase of Colored Beach in 1955, would seven years later as Broward circuit judge effectively desegregate Broward's public beaches by denying the City of Fort Lauderdale's request to enjoin the wade-ins", according to William G. Crawford Jr.

References

Sources
 

1917 births
1971 deaths
University of Miami School of Law alumni
Florida state senators
Judges of the United States District Court for the Southern District of Florida
United States district court judges appointed by Lyndon B. Johnson
20th-century American judges
People from Hobe Sound, Florida
20th-century American politicians